Justice Williamson

John Isaac Williamson, associate justice of the Supreme Court of Missouri
Robert B. Williamson, associate justice of the Maine Supreme Judicial Court
Robert McAlpin Williamson, associate justice of the Republic of Texas Supreme Court
 Neil William Williamson (1938–1996), judge of the High Court of New Zealand who presided over the Bain family murders and Peter Ellis (childcare worker) cases